Maytenus ponceana, the Ponce mayten, is a species of plant in the family Celastraceae. It is endemic to Puerto Rico.

References

ponceana
Endemic flora of Puerto Rico
Trees of Puerto Rico
Taxonomy articles created by Polbot
Taxobox binomials not recognized by IUCN